The Rutgers University Ecological Preserve (RUEP), previously known as Kilmer Woods, is a nature teaching area owned by Rutgers University. This  tract of land is part of the Livingston Campus of Rutgers and is located within the towns of Piscataway, Edison, and Highland Park in Middlesex County, New Jersey. It contains a wide variety of plant life and supports a range of wood dwelling creatures.

History

In November, 2014, a new gateway kiosk was dedicated to the memory of Charlie Kontos, Jr.

Activities
The RUEP is a popular place for hikers and mountain bikers in the central NJ area, especially Rutgers students. It contains challenging terrain that is very close to campus.

Maps of the RUEP
 Most recent trail map (Updated 8/15/2014) provided by Rutgers University
 Historic Trail Map Provided by Highland Park Environmental Commission

References

External links

 Rutgers Ecological Preserve Official Site
 New York New Jersey Trail Conference
 Highland Park Environmental Commission
 NY-NJ-CT Botany Online

Rutgers University
Highland Park, New Jersey
Protected areas of Middlesex County, New Jersey
Nature reserves in New Jersey